Mary Harris Thompson, MD, (April 15, 1829May 21, 1895), was the founder, head physician and surgeon of the Chicago Hospital for Women and Children, renamed Mary Harris Thompson Hospital after her death in 1895.  She was one of the first women to practice medicine in Chicago.

Early life and education 
Thompson was born in Fort Ann, Washington County, New York, April 15, 1829. She was the daughter of John Harris and Calista Corbin Thompson. She began her studies at a nearby school, then transferred to Fort Edward Institute, New York. She continued her studies at a Methodist school, Troy Conference Academy, located in West Poultney, Vermont, and in 1860 enrolled in classes at the New England Female Medical College in Boston. During this time she spent one year in an internship at the New York Infirmary for Women and Children, which was founded by physicians Emily and Elizabeth Blackwell. She received her medical degree in 1863.

In 1890, the Chicago Medical College granted a degree ad eundem to Thompson.

Career 
Upon graduating from the New England Female Medical College, Thompson moved to Chicago, a city which had been founded only 30 years prior and with little competition for a woman physician. She initially worked in the Northwestern Sanitary Commission's Chicago branch (a branch of the United States Sanitary Commission) for Dr. William G. Dyas and Miranda Dyas, serving Civil War veterans’ families in Chicago. During this phase of her career, Thompson was limited in her ability to care for patients; women were not yet permitted to be on any of Chicago's hospital staffs, and at least one area hospital did not admit women as patients.

She then founded her own hospital, with the assistance of Rev. William R. Ryder, who raised funds for the project. In May, 1865, the Chicago Hospital for Women and Children opened, and Thompson became chief surgeon and physician, and head of staff – positions she kept the rest of her life.

In 1870, Thompson founded Woman's Hospital Medical College. She became one of initial nine faculty members, and served in this role until 1879, when the college separated from the hospital. In 1874, she began directing a nursing school within the hospital. In 1892, she joined the faculty of the Northwestern University Woman's Medical School as a clinical professor of gynaecology.

After 10 years of practice, Thompson was admitted to the Chicago Medical Society in 1873; she became the organization's vice president, and its first female officer, in 1886. She was a member of the American Medical Association (AMA), and the AMA's first woman to present a paper to the Section on Diseases of Children, which earned her the role of Section Chair.  She published and presented several papers on women's health and childhood diseases during her career. Thompson's private practice as an abdominal and pelvic surgeon was part of her hospital work, and for years she was the sole woman performing major surgery in Chicago. She also invented several surgical instruments and a special abdominal needle adopted by surgeons at the time.

Great Chicago Fire 
In 1871, the Great Chicago Fire burned down the buildings of the Woman's Hospital Medical College and the Chicago Hospital for Women and Children. Thompson and her staff ensured her patients were cared for, and soon after reopened for burned and sick patients, male and female, in a private home on Adams street.  In 1873, the Relief Aid Society of Chicago donated $25,000 to reopen the hospital and treat patients, and Thompson used the money to open in a new location that same year.

Death 
Thompson died in 1895 at age sixty-six, suffering a cerebral hemorrhage. Shortly after her death, the board of the Chicago Hospital for Women and Children renamed the hospital the Mary Thompson Hospital of Chicago for Women and Children. The hospital closed in 1988. In 1905, the hospital board gave the Art Institute of Chicago a bust of Thompson that they commissioned from sculptor Daniel Chester French. Dr. Thompson  is buried in Fort Ann Cemetery in Fort Ann, New York together with four of her siblings.

References 

1829 births
1895 deaths
People from Fort Ann, New York
American surgeons
Women surgeons
American founders
19th-century American physicians
19th-century American women physicians